The 2021 Wimbledon Championships – Women's Singles Qualifying was a series of tennis matches that took place from 22 to 25 June 2021 (was originally to end on 24 June 2021 resulting a heavy rain on the first day) to determine the sixteen qualifiers into the main draw of the 2021 Wimbledon Championships – Women's singles, and, if necessary, the lucky losers.

Players who neither have high enough rankings nor receive wild cards for the main draw may participate in the qualifying tournament for the annual Wimbledon Tennis Championships.

Seeds

Qualifiers

Lucky losers

Qualifying draw

First qualifier

Second qualifier

Third qualifier

Fourth qualifier

Fifth qualifier

Sixth qualifier

Seventh qualifier

Eighth qualifier

Ninth qualifier

Tenth qualifier

Eleventh qualifier

Twelfth qualifier

Thirteenth qualifier

Fourteenth qualifier

Fifteenth qualifier

Sixteenth qualifier

References

External links
Ladies' Singles Qualifying draw
2021 Wimbledon Championships – Women's draws and results at the International Tennis Federation

Women's Singles Qualifying
Wimbledon Championship by year – Women's singles qualifying
Wimbledon Championships